Glipostenoda hisamatsui is a species of beetle in the genus Glipostenoda. It was described in 1956.

References

hisamatsui
Beetles described in 1956